Jérémie N'Jock (born 12 March 1980) is a Cameroonian former professional footballer who played as a striker.

Football career
N'Jock as born in Bafoussam, Cameroon. Moving abroad at the age of 18, he rarely settled in a club or country. His first team was FC Stade Nyonnais in Switzerland, followed by moves to Qatari (Al-Arabi Sports Club) and Moroccan (WAC Casablanca).

In 2001, N'Jock signed with Stuttgarter Kickers in the German lower leagues, moving to FC UTA Arad from Romania the following year. He scored 11 goals in 25 games in the 2003–04 season, helping another side in the country, FC Universitatea Craiova, to the fourth position in Liga I.

N'Jock joined Belgian First Division club R.A.E.C. Mons in January 2005, and netted a career-best 18 goals in his only full season, adding two in the domestic cup as the Hainaut team returned to the top level as champions.

Ligue 2 side Stade Brestois 29 noticed N'Jock's performances, and signed him for the following campaign. In the next transfer window, however, he left France and re-joined Universitatea Craiova, being loaned to Belgium's A.F.C. Tubize shortly after.

In the following years, N'Jock played for teams in familiar countries, Germany and Belgium, again representing Tubize in the latter. Already in his 30s, he switched to Portugal, playing with G.D. Estoril Praia, F.C. Arouca and Moreirense F.C. in the second division.

Honours
Mons
Belgian Second Division: 2005–06

References

External links

1980 births
Living people
People from Bafoussam
Cameroonian footballers
Association football forwards
Wydad AC players
Qatar Stars League players
Al-Arabi SC (Qatar) players
Mesaimeer SC players
Stuttgarter Kickers players
Liga I players
FC UTA Arad players
FC U Craiova 1948 players
Belgian Pro League players
Challenger Pro League players
R.A.E.C. Mons players
A.F.C. Tubize players
Ligue 2 players
Stade Brestois 29 players
Liga Portugal 2 players
G.D. Estoril Praia players
F.C. Arouca players
Moreirense F.C. players
Qatari Second Division players
Cameroonian expatriate footballers
Expatriate footballers in Switzerland
Expatriate footballers in Qatar
Expatriate footballers in Morocco
Expatriate footballers in Germany
Expatriate footballers in Romania
Expatriate footballers in Belgium
Expatriate footballers in France
Expatriate footballers in Portugal
Cameroonian expatriate sportspeople in Germany
Cameroonian expatriate sportspeople in Romania
Cameroonian expatriate sportspeople in Belgium
Cameroonian expatriate sportspeople in France
Cameroonian expatriate sportspeople in Portugal